Corticomis eupterotioides is a moth of the Anthelidae family. It was described by Van Eecke in 1924. It is found in New Guinea.

References

Moths described in 1924
Anthelidae